"Clown Prince" is a song by Australian hip-hop band, the Hilltop Hoods. It was released in January 2006 as the lead single from their fourth studio album, The Hard Road.

"Clown Price" peaked at #30 in the ARIA charts, becoming the first Hilltop Hoods song to appear on the ARIA Singles Chart. 

The song also charted at #23 on the Triple J Hottest 100, 2006 list.

Sampling
The main bassline used for "Clown Prince" is sampled from "Laying Pipe" by Pornosonic. It was previously used in a 70's pornographic film, featuring Ron Jeremy.
It also contains vocal samples of The Notorious B.I.G.'s "Things Done Changed" and A Tribe Called Quest's "Excursions". A remix of the song featuring the Adelaide Symphony Orchestra was also released on the Hilltop Hoods' 2007 remix album The Hard Road: Restrung.

Music video
The music video for the song solely features animation.

CD single track listing

Personnel
 Artwork (Graphic Design) - Benjamin Funnell 
 Artwork (Illustration) - John Engelhardt 
 Mastered - Neville Clark

Charts

Weekly chart

Year-end chart

Release history

References

External links
Music video

2006 singles
Hilltop Hoods songs
Obese Records singles
2006 songs
Songs written by Suffa
Songs written by MC Pressure